Labor notes may refer to:

 Labor Notes, a 20th-century labor organization and its eponymous magazine based in Detroit, Michigan
 Labour voucher, an alternative currency based on exchange of hours of labour